Ah Yeah (stylized in all caps) is the second extended play by South Korean girl group EXID. It was released on April 13, 2015 by Yedang Entertainment and distributed by Sony Music. The EP was supported by two singles: "Up & Down", which served as the lead single, and the title track "Ah Yeah", which was released as a follow-up single to the former.

Background and release
On March 4, 2015, Star News reported that Exid was working on a new song, scheduled for release in the second week of April, but it was undecided whether the song would be released as a single or with a mini-album. On April 3, the album's cover art and tracklist were leaked online, prompting Yedang to issue a statement the following day that the company would take legal action if the leak harmed the success of the group's comeback.

Exid held a showcase at Noon Square in Myeongdong on April 12, where they performed "Ah Yeah" for the public for the first time.

As of October 2015, the album has sold  over 18,000 copies in South Korea, and 7,000 copies in Japan.

Composition
The album was composed by Shinsadong Tiger, who has been the group's producer since their debut. Member LE also participated in the album's production, co-writing and composing all the songs on the album. The title track, "Ah Yeah", is a hip-hop style dance song with a repetitive hook. "Pat Pat" is described as an "urban R&B" song and "With Out U" as an "urban dance" song. The album also includes their previous single "Up & Down" as well as a new version of "Every Night."

The first single made headlines for its belated chart run — after initial mediocre success, the song started charting three months after its debut. The late success of the single was attributed to a fan-cam video of member Hani performing the song, which went viral across Korean social media networks in late November.

Track listing

Charts

Weekly charts

Monthly charts

Awards and nominations

Annual music awards

Music program awards

Release history

References

2015 EPs
Korean-language EPs
EXID albums